Machine translation, sometimes referred to by the abbreviation MT (not to be confused with computer-aided translation, machine-aided human translation or interactive translation), is a sub-field of computational linguistics that investigates the use of software to translate text or speech from one language to another.

On a basic level, MT performs mechanical substitution of words in one language for words in another, but that alone rarely produces a good translation because recognition of whole phrases and their closest counterparts in the target language is needed. Not all words in one language have equivalent words in another language, and many words have more than one meaning. 

Solving this problem with corpus statistical and neural techniques is a rapidly growing field that is leading to better translations, handling differences in linguistic typology, translation of idioms, and the isolation of anomalies.

Current machine translation software often allows for customization by domain or profession (such as weather reports), improving output by limiting the scope of allowable substitutions. This technique is particularly effective in domains where formal or formulaic language is used. It follows that machine translation of government and legal documents more readily produces usable output than machine translation of conversation or less standardised text.

Improved output quality can also be achieved by human intervention: for example, some systems are able to translate more accurately if the user has unambiguously identified which words in the text are proper names. With the assistance of these techniques, MT has proven useful as a tool to assist human translators and, in a very limited number of cases, can even produce output that can be used as is (e.g., weather reports).

The progress and potential of machine translation have been much debated through its history. Since the 1950s, a number of scholars, first and most notably Yehoshua Bar-Hillel, have questioned the possibility of achieving fully automatic machine translation of high quality.

History

Origins
The origins of machine translation can be traced back to the work of Al-Kindi, a ninth-century Arabic cryptographer who developed techniques for systemic language translation, including cryptanalysis, frequency analysis, and probability and statistics, which are used in modern machine translation. The idea of machine translation later appeared in the 17th century. In 1629, René Descartes proposed a universal language, with equivalent ideas in different tongues sharing one symbol.

The idea of using digital computers for translation of natural languages was proposed as early as 1946 by England's A. D. Booth and Warren Weaver at Rockefeller Foundation at the same time. "The memorandum written by Warren Weaver in 1949 is
perhaps the single most influential publication in the earliest days of machine translation." Others followed. A demonstration was made in 1954 on the APEXC machine at Birkbeck College (University of London) of a rudimentary translation of English into French. Several papers on the topic were published at the time, and even articles in popular journals (for example an article by Cleave and Zacharov in the September 1955 issue of Wireless World).  A similar application, also pioneered at Birkbeck College at the time, was reading and composing Braille texts by computer.

1950s
The first researcher in the field, Yehoshua Bar-Hillel, began his research at MIT (1951). A Georgetown University MT research team, led by Professor Michael Zarechnak, followed (1951) with a public demonstration of its Georgetown-IBM experiment system in 1954. MT research programs popped up in Japan and Russia (1955), and the first MT conference was held in London (1956).

David G. Hays "wrote about computer-assisted language processing as early as 1957" and "was project leader on computational linguistics
at Rand from 1955 to 1968."

1960–1975
Researchers continued to join the field as the Association for Machine Translation and Computational Linguistics was formed in the U.S. (1962) and the National Academy of Sciences formed the Automatic Language Processing Advisory Committee (ALPAC) to study MT (1964). Real progress was much slower, however, and after the ALPAC report (1966), which found that the ten-year-long research had failed to fulfill expectations, funding was greatly reduced. According to a 1972 report by the Director of Defense Research and Engineering (DDR&E), the feasibility of large-scale MT was reestablished by the success of the Logos MT system in translating military manuals into Vietnamese during that conflict.

The French Textile Institute also used MT to translate abstracts from and into French, English, German and Spanish (1970); Brigham Young University started a project to translate Mormon texts by automated translation (1971).

1975 and beyond
SYSTRAN, which "pioneered the field under contracts from the U.S. government" in the 1960s, was used by Xerox to translate technical manuals (1978). Beginning in the late 1980s, as computational power increased and became less expensive, more interest was shown in statistical models for machine translation. MT became more popular after the advent of computers. SYSTRAN's first implementation system was implemented in 1988 by the online service of the French Postal Service called Minitel. Various computer based translation companies were also launched, including Trados (1984), which was the first to develop and market Translation Memory technology (1989), though this is not the same as MT. The first commercial MT system for Russian / English / German-Ukrainian was developed at Kharkov State University (1991).

By 1998, "for as little as $29.95" one could "buy a program for translating in one direction between English and a major European language of
your choice" to run on a PC.

MT on the web started with SYSTRAN offering free translation of small texts (1996) and then providing this via AltaVista Babelfish, which racked up 500,000 requests a day (1997). The second free translation service on the web was Lernout & Hauspie's GlobaLink. Atlantic Magazine wrote in 1998 that "Systran's Babelfish and GlobaLink's Comprende" handled
"Don't bank on it" with a "competent performance."

Franz Josef Och (the future head of Translation Development AT Google) won DARPA's speed MT competition (2003). More innovations during this time included MOSES, the open-source statistical MT engine (2007), a text/SMS translation service for mobiles in Japan (2008), and a mobile phone with built-in speech-to-speech translation functionality for English, Japanese and Chinese (2009). In 2012, Google announced that Google Translate translates roughly enough text to fill 1 million books in one day.

Translation process

The human translation process may be described as:
 Decoding the meaning of the source text; and
 Re-encoding this meaning in the target language.

Behind this ostensibly simple procedure lies a complex cognitive operation.  To decode the meaning of the source text in its entirety, the translator must interpret and analyse all the features of the text, a process that requires in-depth knowledge of the grammar, semantics, syntax, idioms, etc., of the source language, as well as the culture of its speakers. The translator needs the same in-depth knowledge to re-encode the meaning in the target language.

Therein lies the challenge in machine translation: how to program a computer that will "understand" a text as a person does, and that will "create" a new text in the target language that sounds as if it has been written by a person. Unless aided by a 'knowledge base' MT provides only a general, though imperfect, approximation of the original text, getting the "gist" of it (a process called "gisting"). This is sufficient for many purposes, including making best use of the finite and expensive time of a human translator, reserved for those cases in which total accuracy is indispensable.

Approaches

Machine translation can use a method based on linguistic rules, which means that words will be translated in a linguistic way – the most suitable (orally speaking) words of the target language will replace the ones in the source language.

It is often argued that the success of machine translation requires the problem of natural language understanding to be solved first.

Generally, rule-based methods parse a text, usually creating an intermediary, symbolic representation, from which the text in the target language is generated. According to the nature of the intermediary representation, an approach is described as interlingual machine translation or transfer-based machine translation. These methods require extensive lexicons with morphological, syntactic, and semantic information, and large sets of rules.

Given enough data, machine translation programs often work well enough for a native speaker of one language to get the approximate meaning of what is written by the other native speaker. The difficulty is getting enough data of the right kind to support the particular method. For example, the large multilingual corpus of data needed for statistical methods to work is not necessary for the grammar-based methods. But then, the grammar methods need a skilled linguist to carefully design the grammar that they use.

To translate between closely related languages, the technique referred to as rule-based machine translation may be used.

Rule-based

The rule-based machine translation paradigm includes transfer-based machine translation, interlingual machine translation and dictionary-based machine translation paradigms. This type of translation is used mostly in the creation of dictionaries and grammar programs. Unlike other methods, RBMT involves more information about the linguistics of the source and target languages, using the morphological and syntactic rules and semantic analysis of both languages. The basic approach involves linking the structure of the input sentence with the structure of the output sentence using a parser and an analyzer for the source language, a generator for the target language, and a transfer lexicon for the actual translation. RBMT's biggest downfall is that everything must be made explicit: orthographical variation and erroneous input must be made part of the source language analyser in order to cope with it, and lexical selection rules must be written for all instances of ambiguity. Adapting to new domains in itself is not that hard, as the core grammar is the same across domains, and the domain-specific adjustment is limited to lexical selection adjustment.

Transfer-based machine translation

Transfer-based machine translation is similar to interlingual machine translation in that it creates a translation from an intermediate representation that simulates the meaning of the original sentence. Unlike interlingual MT, it depends partially on the language pair involved in the translation.

Interlingual

Interlingual machine translation is one instance of rule-based machine-translation approaches.  In this approach, the source language, i.e. the text to be translated, is transformed into an interlingual language, i.e. a "language neutral" representation that is independent of any language. The target language is then generated out of the interlingua. One of the major advantages of this system is that the interlingua becomes more valuable as the number of target languages it can be turned into increases. However, the only interlingual machine translation system that has been made operational at the commercial level is the KANT system (Nyberg and Mitamura, 1992), which is designed to translate Caterpillar Technical English (CTE) into other languages.

Dictionary-based

Machine translation can use a method based on dictionary entries, which means that the words will be translated as they are by a dictionary.

Statistical

Statistical machine translation tries to generate translations using statistical methods based on bilingual text corpora, such as the Canadian Hansard corpus, the English-French record of the Canadian parliament and EUROPARL, the record of the European Parliament. Where such corpora are available, good results can be achieved translating similar texts, but such corpora are still rare for many language pairs. The first statistical machine translation software was CANDIDE from IBM. Google used SYSTRAN for several years, but switched to a statistical translation method in October 2007. In 2005, Google improved its internal translation capabilities by using approximately 200 billion words from United Nations materials to train their system; translation accuracy improved. Google Translate and similar statistical translation programs work by detecting patterns in hundreds of millions of documents that have previously been translated by humans and making intelligent guesses based on the findings. Generally, the more human-translated documents available in a given language, the more likely it is that the translation will be of good quality. Newer approaches into Statistical Machine translation such as METIS II and PRESEMT use minimal corpus size and instead focus on derivation of syntactic structure through pattern recognition. With further development, this may allow statistical machine translation to operate off of a monolingual text corpus. SMT's biggest downfall includes it being dependent upon huge amounts of parallel texts, its problems with morphology-rich languages (especially with translating into such languages), and its inability to correct singleton errors.

Example-based

Example-based machine translation (EBMT) approach was proposed by Makoto Nagao in 1984. Example-based machine translation is based on the idea of analogy. In this approach, the corpus that is used is one that contains texts that have already been translated. Given a sentence that is to be translated, sentences from this corpus are selected that contain similar sub-sentential components. The similar sentences are then used to translate the sub-sentential components of the original sentence into the target language, and these phrases are put together to form a complete translation.

Hybrid MT

Hybrid machine translation (HMT) leverages the strengths of statistical and rule-based translation methodologies. Several MT organizations claim a hybrid approach that uses both rules and statistics. The approaches differ in a number of ways:
 Rules post-processed by statistics: Translations are performed using a rules based engine. Statistics are then used in an attempt to adjust/correct the output from the rules engine.
 Statistics guided by rules: Rules are used to pre-process data in an attempt to better guide the statistical engine. Rules are also used to post-process the statistical output to perform functions such as normalization. This approach has a lot more power, flexibility and control when translating. It also provides extensive control over the way in which the content is processed during both pre-translation (e.g. markup of content and non-translatable terms) and post-translation (e.g. post translation corrections and adjustments).
More recently, with the advent of Neural MT, a new version of hybrid machine translation is emerging that combines the benefits of rules, statistical and neural machine translation. The approach allows benefitting from pre- and post-processing in a rule guided workflow as well as benefitting from NMT and SMT. The downside is the inherent complexity which makes the approach suitable only for specific use cases.

Neural MT

A deep learning-based approach to MT, neural machine translation has made rapid progress in recent years, and Google has announced its translation services are now using this technology in preference over its previous statistical methods. A Microsoft team claimed to have reached human parity on WMT-2017 ("EMNLP 2017 
Second Conference On Machine Translation") in 2018, marking a historical milestone. 
However, many researchers have criticized this claim, rerunning and discussing their experiments; current consensus is that the so-called human parity achieved is not real, being based wholly on limited domains, language pairs, and certain test suites i.e., it lacks statistical significance power. There is still a long journey before NMT reaches real human parity performances.

To address the idiomatic phrase translation, multi-word expressions, and low-frequency words (also called OOV, or out-of-vocabulary word translation), language-focused linguistic features have been explored in state-of-the-art neural machine translation (NMT) models. For instance, the Chinese character decompositions into radicals and strokes have proven to be helpful for translating multi-word expressions in NMT.

Translations by neural MT tools like DeepL Translator, which is thought to usually deliver the best machine translation results as of 2022, typically still need post-editing by a human.

Potential AI-based techniques to improve translations
Techniques in use and under development that can improve machine translations beyond training- and training-data (mainly parallel corpora) related techniques include:
 Natural language processing – enabling semantic understanding of the source text (e.g. meaning, sense, named entities and contexts) as well as adjustments via a database of facts about the real world to improve translation results. In a study a "semantic unit library" was used to complete "the translation in combination with the target language sentences".
 Post-editing using GPT-3

Major issues

Studies using human evaluation (e.g. by professional literary translators or human readers) have systematically identified various issues with the latest advanced MT outputs. Common issues include the translation of ambiguous parts whose correct translation requires common sense-like semantic language processing or context. There can also be errors in the source texts, missing high-quality training data and the severity of frequency of several types of problems may not get reduced with techniques used to date, requiring some level of human active participation.

Disambiguation

Word-sense disambiguation concerns finding a suitable translation when a word can have more than one meaning. The problem was first raised in the 1950s by Yehoshua Bar-Hillel. He pointed out that without a "universal encyclopedia", a machine would never be able to distinguish between the two meanings of a word. Today there are numerous approaches designed to overcome this problem. They can be approximately divided into "shallow" approaches and "deep" approaches.

Shallow approaches assume no knowledge of the text. They simply apply statistical methods to the words surrounding the ambiguous word. Deep approaches presume a comprehensive knowledge of the word. So far, shallow approaches have been more successful.

Claude Piron, a long-time translator for the United Nations and the World Health Organization, wrote that machine translation, at its best, automates the easier part of a translator's job; the harder and more time-consuming part usually involves doing extensive research to resolve ambiguities in the source text, which the grammatical and lexical exigencies of the target language require to be resolved:

The ideal deep approach would require the translation software to do all the research necessary for this kind of disambiguation on its own; but this would require a higher degree of AI than has yet been attained.  A shallow approach which simply guessed at the sense of the ambiguous English phrase that Piron mentions (based, perhaps, on which kind of prisoner-of-war camp is more often mentioned in a given corpus) would have a reasonable chance of guessing wrong fairly often.  A shallow approach that involves "ask the user about each ambiguity" would, by Piron's estimate, only automate about 25% of a professional translator's job, leaving the harder 75% still to be done by a human.

Non-standard speech
One of the major pitfalls of MT is its inability to translate non-standard language with the same accuracy as standard language. Heuristic or statistical based MT takes input from various sources in standard form of a language. Rule-based translation, by nature, does not include common non-standard usages. This causes errors in translation from a vernacular source or into colloquial language. Limitations on translation from casual speech present issues in the use of machine translation in mobile devices.

Named entities

In information extraction, named entities, in a narrow sense, refer to concrete or abstract entities in the real world such as people, organizations, companies, and places that have a proper name: George Washington, Chicago, Microsoft.  It also refers to expressions of time, space and quantity such as 1 July 2011, $500.

In the sentence "Smith is the president of Fabrionix" both Smith and Fabrionix are named entities, and can be further qualified via first name or other information; "president" is not, since Smith could have earlier held another position at Fabrionix, e.g. Vice President.
The term rigid designator is what defines these usages for analysis in statistical machine translation.

Named entities must first be identified in the text; if not, they may be erroneously translated as common nouns, which would most likely not affect the BLEU rating of the translation but would change the text's human readability. They may be omitted from the output translation, which would also have implications for the text's readability and message.

Transliteration includes finding the letters in the target language that most closely correspond to the name in the source language.  This, however, has been cited as sometimes worsening the quality of translation. For "Southern California" the first word should be translated directly, while the second word should be transliterated.  Machines often transliterate both because they treated them as one entity.  Words like these are hard for machine translators, even those with a transliteration component, to process.

Use of a "do-not-translate" list, which has the same end goal – transliteration as opposed to translation.  still relies on correct identification of named entities.

A third approach is a class-based model. Named entities are replaced with a token to represent their "class"; "Ted"  and "Erica" would both be replaced with "person" class token. Then the statistical distribution and use of person names, in general, can be analyzed instead of looking at the distributions of "Ted" and "Erica" individually, so that the probability of a given name in a specific language will not affect the assigned probability of a translation. A study by Stanford on improving this area of translation gives the examples that different probabilities will be assigned to "David is going for a walk" and "Ankit is going for a walk" for English as a target language due to the different number of occurrences for each name in the training data. A frustrating outcome of the same study by Stanford (and other attempts to improve named recognition translation) is that many times, a decrease in the BLEU scores for translation will result from the inclusion of methods for named entity translation.

Somewhat related are the phrases "drinking tea with milk" vs. "drinking tea with Molly."

Translation from multiparallel sources
Some work has been done in the utilization of multiparallel corpora, that is a body of text that has been translated into 3 or more languages.  Using these methods, a text that has been translated into 2 or more languages may be utilized in combination to provide a more accurate translation into a third language compared with if just one of those source languages were used alone.

Ontologies in MT
An ontology is a formal representation of knowledge that includes the concepts (such as objects, processes etc.) in a domain and some relations between them. If the stored information is of linguistic nature, one can speak of a lexicon.
In NLP, ontologies can be used as a source of knowledge for machine translation systems. With access to a large knowledge base, systems can be enabled to resolve many (especially lexical) ambiguities on their own.
In the following classic examples, as humans, we are able to interpret the prepositional phrase according to the context because we use our world knowledge, stored in our lexicons:

I saw a man/star/molecule with a microscope/telescope/binoculars.

A machine translation system initially would not be able to differentiate between the meanings because syntax does not change. With a large enough ontology as a source of knowledge however, the possible interpretations of ambiguous words in a specific context can be reduced.
Other areas of usage for ontologies within NLP include information retrieval, information extraction and text summarization.

Building ontologies
The ontology generated for the PANGLOSS knowledge-based machine translation system in 1993 may serve as an example of how an ontology for NLP purposes can be compiled:
 A large-scale ontology is necessary to help parsing in the active modules of the machine translation system.
 In the PANGLOSS example, about 50,000 nodes were intended to be subsumed under the smaller, manually-built upper (abstract) region of the ontology. Because of its size, it had to be created automatically.
 The goal was to merge the two resources LDOCE online and WordNet to combine the benefits of both: concise definitions from Longman, and semantic relations allowing for semi-automatic taxonomization to the ontology from WordNet.
 A definition match algorithm was created to automatically merge the correct meanings of ambiguous words between the two online resources, based on the words that the definitions of those meanings have in common in LDOCE and WordNet. Using a similarity matrix, the algorithm delivered matches between meanings including a confidence factor. This algorithm alone, however, did not match all meanings correctly on its own.
 A second hierarchy match algorithm was therefore created which uses the taxonomic hierarchies found in WordNet (deep hierarchies) and partially in LDOCE (flat hierarchies). This works by first matching unambiguous meanings, then limiting the search space to only the respective ancestors and descendants of those matched meanings. Thus, the algorithm matched locally unambiguous meanings (for instance, while the word seal as such is ambiguous, there is only one meaning of seal in the animal subhierarchy).
 Both algorithms complemented each other and helped constructing a large-scale ontology for the machine translation system. The WordNet hierarchies, coupled with the matching definitions of LDOCE, were subordinated to the ontology's upper region. As a result, the PANGLOSS MT system was able to make use of this knowledge base, mainly in its generation element.

Applications 
While no system provides the ideal of fully automatic high-quality machine translation of unrestricted text, many fully automated systems produce reasonable output. The quality of machine translation is substantially improved if the domain is restricted and controlled. This enables using machine translation as a tool to speed up and simplify translations, as well as producing flawed but useful low-cost or ad-hoc translations.

Travel
Machine translation applications have also been released for most mobile devices, including mobile telephones, pocket PCs, PDAs, etc. Due to their portability, such instruments have come to be designated as mobile translation tools enabling mobile business networking between partners speaking different languages, or facilitating both foreign language learning and unaccompanied traveling to foreign countries without the need of the intermediation of a human translator.

For example, the Google Translate app allows foreigners to quickly translate text in their surrounding via augmented reality using the smartphone camera that overlays the translated text onto the text. It can also recognize speech and then translate it.

Public administration
Despite their inherent limitations, MT programs are used around the world. Probably the largest institutional user is the European Commission. The  project, for example, coordinated by the University of Gothenburg, received more than 2.375 million euros project support from the EU to create a reliable translation tool that covers a majority of the EU languages. The further development of MT systems comes at a time when budget cuts in human translation may increase the EU's dependency on reliable MT programs. The European Commission contributed 3.072 million euros (via its ISA programme) for the creation of MT@EC, a statistical machine translation program tailored to the administrative needs of the EU, to replace a previous rule-based machine translation system.

Wikipedia
Machine translation has also be used for translating Wikipedia articles and could play a larger role in creating, updating, expanding, and generally improving articles in the future, especially as the MT capabilities may improve. There is a "content translation tool" which allows editors to more easily translate articles across several select languages. English version are thought to usually be more comprehensive and less biased than their non-translated equivalent in another language. As of 2022, English Wikipedia has over 6.5 million articles while the German and Swedish Wikipedias each only have over 2.5 million articles, each often far less comprehensive.

Surveillance and military
With the recent focus on terrorism, the military sources in the United States have been investing significant amounts of money in natural language engineering. In-Q-Tel (a venture capital fund, largely funded by the US Intelligence Community, to stimulate new technologies through private sector entrepreneurs) brought up companies like Language Weaver. Currently the military community is interested in translation and processing of languages like Arabic, Pashto, and Dari. Within these languages, the focus is on key phrases and quick communication between military members and civilians through the use of mobile phone apps. The Information Processing Technology Office in DARPA hosts programs like TIDES and Babylon translator. US Air Force has awarded a $1 million contract to develop a language translation technology.

Social media
The notable rise of social networking on the web in recent years has created yet another niche for the application of machine translation software – in utilities such as Facebook, or instant messaging clients such as Skype, GoogleTalk, MSN Messenger, etc. – allowing users speaking different languages to communicate with each other.

Medicine
Despite being labelled as an unworthy competitor to human translation in 1966 by the Automated Language Processing Advisory Committee put together by the United States government, the quality of machine translation has now been improved to such levels that its application in online collaboration and in the medical field are being investigated. The application of this technology in medical settings where human translators are absent is another topic of research, but difficulties arise due to the importance of accurate translations in medical diagnoses.

Evaluation

There are many factors that affect how machine translation systems are evaluated. These factors include the intended use of the translation, the nature of the machine translation software, and the nature of the translation process.

Different programs may work well for different purposes. For example, statistical machine translation (SMT) typically outperforms example-based machine translation (EBMT), but researchers found that when evaluating English to French translation, EBMT performs better. The same concept applies for technical documents, which can be more easily translated by SMT because of their formal language.

In certain applications, however, e.g., product descriptions written in a controlled language, a dictionary-based machine-translation system has produced satisfactory translations that require no human intervention save for quality inspection.

There are various means for evaluating the output quality of machine translation systems. The oldest is the use of human judges to assess a translation's quality. Even though human evaluation is time-consuming, it is still the most reliable method to compare different systems such as rule-based and statistical systems. Automated means of evaluation include BLEU, NIST, METEOR, and LEPOR.

Relying exclusively on unedited machine translation ignores the fact that communication in human language is context-embedded and that it takes a person to comprehend the context of the original text with a reasonable degree of probability. It is certainly true that even purely human-generated translations are prone to error. Therefore, to ensure that a machine-generated translation will be useful to a human being and that publishable-quality translation is achieved, such translations must be reviewed and edited by a human. The late Claude Piron wrote that machine translation, at its best, automates the easier part of a translator's job; the harder and more time-consuming part usually involves doing extensive research to resolve ambiguities in the source text, which the grammatical and lexical exigencies of the target language require to be resolved. Such research is a necessary prelude to the pre-editing necessary in order to provide input for machine-translation software such that the output will not be meaningless.

In addition to disambiguation problems, decreased accuracy can occur due to varying levels of training data for machine translating programs. Both example-based and statistical machine translation rely on a vast array of real example sentences as a base for translation, and when too many or too few sentences are analyzed accuracy is jeopardized. Researchers found that when a program is trained on 203,529 sentence pairings, accuracy actually decreases. The optimal level of training data seems to be just over 100,000 sentences, possibly because as training data increases, the number of possible sentences increases, making it harder to find an exact translation match.

Flaws in machine translation have been noted for their entertainment value. Two videos uploaded to YouTube in April 2017 involve two Japanese hiragana characters えぐ (e and gu) being repeatedly pasted into Google Translate, with the resulting translations quickly degrading into nonsensical phrases such as "DECEARING EGG" and "Deep-sea squeeze trees", which are then read in increasingly absurd voices; the full-length version of the video currently has 6.9 million views as of March 2022.

Using machine translation as a teaching tool
Although there have been concerns about machine translation's accuracy, Dr. Ana Nino of the University of Manchester has researched some of the advantages in utilizing machine translation in the classroom.  One such pedagogical method is called using "MT as a Bad Model."  MT as a Bad Model forces the language learner to identify inconsistencies or incorrect aspects of a translation; in turn, the individual will (hopefully) possess a better grasp of the language.  Dr. Nino cites that this teaching tool was implemented in the late 1980s.  At the end of various semesters, Dr. Nino was able to obtain survey results from students who had used MT as a Bad Model (as well as other models.)  Overwhelmingly, students felt that they had observed improved comprehension, lexical retrieval, and increased confidence in their target language.

Machine translation and signed languages

In the early 2000s, options for machine translation between spoken and signed languages were severely limited. It was a common belief that deaf individuals could use traditional translators. However, stress, intonation, pitch, and timing are conveyed much differently in spoken languages compared to signed languages. Therefore, a deaf individual may misinterpret or become confused about the meaning of written text that is based on a spoken language.

Researchers Zhao, et al. (2000), developed a prototype called TEAM (translation from English to ASL by machine) that completed English to American Sign Language (ASL) translations. The program would first analyze the syntactic, grammatical, and morphological aspects of the English text. Following this step, the program accessed a sign synthesizer, which acted as a dictionary for ASL. This synthesizer housed the process one must follow to complete ASL signs, as well as the meanings of these signs. Once the entire text is analyzed and the signs necessary to complete the translation are located in the synthesizer, a computer generated human appeared and would use ASL to sign the English text to the user.

Copyright
Only works that are original are subject to copyright protection, so some scholars claim that machine translation results are not entitled to copyright protection because MT does not involve creativity. The copyright at issue is for a derivative work; the author of the original work in the original language does not lose his rights when a work is translated: a translator must have permission to publish a translation.

See also

AI-complete
Cache language model
Comparison of machine translation applications
Comparison of different machine translation approaches
Computational linguistics
Computer-assisted translation and Translation memory
Controlled language in machine translation
Controlled natural language
Foreign language writing aid
Fuzzy matching
History of machine translation
Human language technology
Humour in translation ("howlers")
Language and Communication Technologies
Language barrier
List of emerging technologies
List of research laboratories for machine translation
Mobile translation
Neural machine translation
OpenLogos
Phraselator
Postediting
Pseudo-translation
Round-trip translation
Statistical machine translation

Translation memory
ULTRA (machine translation system)
Universal Networking Language
Universal translator

Notes

Further reading

External links

 The Advantages and Disadvantages of Machine Translation
 International Association for Machine Translation (IAMT) 
Machine Translation Archive  by John Hutchins. An electronic repository (and bibliography) of articles, books and papers in the field of machine translation and computer-based translation technology
Machine translation (computer-based translation) – Publications by John Hutchins (includes PDFs of several books on machine translation)
Machine Translation and Minority Languages
John Hutchins 1999 
Slator News & analysis of the latest developments in machine translation

 
Applications of artificial intelligence
Computational linguistics
Computer-assisted translation
Tasks of natural language processing